The 1949 Edmonton Eskimos season was the first season in the current franchise's history after several other Edmonton teams played under the same moniker but were unrelated. The team finished in 3rd place in the WIFU with a 4–10 record and missed the playoffs.

Pre-season
No preseason games were played for this season.

Regular season

Standings

Schedule

References

Edmonton Elks seasons
1949 Canadian football season by team